Neophilaenus lineatus, the lined spittlebug, is a species of spittlebug in the family Aphrophoridae. It is found in Europe, northern Asia (excluding China), and North America.

Subspecies
These two subspecies belong to the species Neophilaenus lineatus:
 Neophilaenus lineatus aterrimus (Sahlberg, 1871) c g
 Neophilaenus lineatus lineatus g
Data sources: i = ITIS, c = Catalogue of Life, g = GBIF, b = Bugguide.net

References

Further reading

External links

 

Articles created by Qbugbot
Insects described in 1758
Taxa named by Carl Linnaeus
Aphrophoridae